Westcott House is an Anglican theological college based on Jesus Lane in the centre of the university city of Cambridge in the United Kingdom. Its main activity is training people for ordained ministry in the Church of England and other Anglican churches. Westcott House is a founding member of the Cambridge Theological Federation. The college is considered by many to be Liberal Catholic in its tradition, but it accepts ordinands from a range of traditions in the Church of England.

History
Westcott House began its life in 1881 as the Cambridge Clergy Training School. Brooke Foss Westcott, the then Regius Professor of Divinity at the University of Cambridge, was its first president. He later became the Bishop of Durham. A pioneering and respected New Testament scholar himself, the school was the product of Westcott's own passionate concern to raise the standard of clergy education and to equip clergy to meet the challenges of parish ministry. Westcott was also exercised by the way in which the Church of England was increasingly dominated by parties and factions. Westcott himself eschewed any party affiliation. The college has often been associated with a "Liberal Catholic" ethos, although its essential charism embraces the breadth of the Church of England and the wider church: 'As a scholar, educator, priest and prophet, Westcott's legacy to the Church of England challenges sectarianism, ignorance, complacency and empty faith. This is the spirit which Westcott House seeks to honour today, drawing students from all backgrounds to prepare them for ministry in this historic centre of Christian learning'.

In response to the Faith in the City report, published in 1985, the college has retained a firm commitment to develop expertise and capacity in the field of urban ministry and mission. Through its partnership with the Diocese of Manchester, the college has pioneered patterns of context-based learning and innovative approaches to contextual theology for over twenty years. These approaches have been widely imitated and developed by other theological education institutions. The college has also developed a programme for continuing ministerial development through the Westcott Foundation.

The college provides training pathways in conjunction with the University of Cambridge and the Common Awards (validated by Durham University). It describes itself as "the home of a diverse, inclusive and international community of people who share a vision of ministry to all society". Drawing on the inspiration of B. F. Westcott and others, its ethos is expressed in a rule of life which was adopted in 2014.

Notable people

List of principals 
The head of Westcott House is known as the principal. All the principals of the Clergy Training School and of Westcott House have  been Anglican priests.

1887–1901: Frederic Chase
1901–1911: Henry Knight
1911–1916: Charles Lambert
1916–1919: Closed during World War I
1919–1943: Bertram Cunningham
1943–1947: William Greer
1948–1961: Kenneth Carey
1962–1972: Peter Walker
1972–1981: Mark Santer
1981–1993: Rupert Hoare
1993–2006: Michael Roberts
2006–2015: Martin Seeley
2015–2019: Chris Chivers
2019–2020 (acting): Paul Dominiak, Vice-Principal
2020–2021 (interim): Tim Stevens
2021–present: Helen Dawes

Staff 

Besides the aforementioned principals, notable staff have included:
Charles Freer Andrews, vice-principal; then missionary, educator and social reformer in India
Michael Beasley, chaplain, tutor and vice-principal; current bishop suffragan of Hertford
Spencer Carpenter, vice-principal; later Dean of Exeter
John Collins, vice-principal: later Canon of St Paul's Cathedral
Don Cupitt, vice-principal; later Dean of Emmanuel College, Cambridge
Charles Garrad, vice-principal; then missionary and Bible translator in Burma
John Habgood, vice-principal; later Bishop of Durham and Archbishop of York
John Harmer, vice-principal: later Bishop of Adelaide and Bishop of Rochester
Hugh Montefiore, vice-principal; later Bishop of Birmingham
Jeremy Morris, tutor, director of studies and vice-principal; former Master of Trinity Hall, Cambridge
Robert Runcie, chaplain, tutor and vice-principal; later principal of Ripon College Cuddesdon, Bishop of St Albans and Archbishop of Canterbury
Mary Tanner, tutor; later European President of the World Council of Churches
Angela Tilby, tutor and vice-principal; current Canon of Christ Church, Oxford
Alan Webster, chaplain and vice-principal; later Dean of St Paul's
Harry Williams, chaplain and tutor: later Dean of Trinity College, Cambridge, theologian and monk of the Community of the Resurrection
Rowan Williams, chaplain, tutor and director of studies; later Lady Margaret Professor of Divinity at Oxford and canon of Christ Church Bishop of Monmouth, Archbishop of Wales, Archbishop of Canterbury and Master of Magdalene
Edward Wynn, vice-principal; later Bishop of Ely

Alumni 

Notable alumni of Westcott House and of the Clergy Training School include:

Robert Atwell, current bishop of Exeter
Paul Badham, Professor emeritus of Theology and Religious Studies at the University of Wales, Lampeter
Simon Bailey, writer and priest
Alister McGrath, Professor in Science and Religion and writer
Andrew Ballard, retired archdeacon of Manchester
David Bartleet, Bishop suffragan of Tonbridge
Dewi Bridges, Bishop of Swansea and Brecon
Gareth Bennett, academic renowned for criticising the then-Archbishop
Chiu Ban It, Bishop of Singapore
Stephen Conway, current bishop of Ely
Christopher Cunliffe, current archdeacon of Derby
Henry de Candole, Bishop suffragan of Knaresborough and liturgist
Griff Dines, Provost of St Mary's Cathedral, Glasgow
Maurice O'Connor Drury, left Westcott after one year
Peter Eaton, current bishop of the Episcopal Diocese of South-East Florida
David Edwards, Provost of Southwark
Peter Eliot, Archdeacon of Worcester
Ralph Emmerson, Bishop suffragan of Knaresborough
Michael (Fisher) SSF, Bishop suffragan of St Germans
Launcelot Fleming, Bishop of Norwich
Frank Ford, Archdeacon of the East Riding
David Galliford, Bishop suffragan of Bolton
Herbert Gwyer, Bishop of George
Stuart Hallam, a current Naval chaplain
Barry Hollowell, Bishop of Calgary
Forbes Horan, Bishop suffragan of Tewkesbury
Anthony Hoskyns-Abrahall, Bishop suffragan of Lancaster
Noel Hudson, Bishop of Labuan and Sarawak
Andrew Hunter, former MP for Basingstoke
Robert Keable, novelist and missionary
John Lewis, Archdeacon of Hereford
Barry Morgan, former archbishop of Wales and Bishop of Llandaff
Edward Patey, Dean of Liverpool
Guy Pentreath, chaplain and headmaster
John Polkinghorne, theoretical physicist and theologian
William Rees, Archdeacon of St Asaph
David Reindorp, vicar
John Richardson, Archdeacon of Derby
John Robinson, Bishop suffragan of Woolwich
Patrick Rodger, Bishop of Oxford
John Edmondson, member of the House of Lords
Paul Shinji Sasaki, Bishop of Tokyo
Allan Shaw, Dean of Ely
Shimun XXI or XXIII Eshai, Patriarch of the Assyrian Church of the East
Percival Smith, Archdeacon of Lynn
Mervyn Stockwood, Bishop of Southwark
Carol Stone, vicar
Graham Usher, current Bishop of Norwich
Graham Ward, current Regius Professor of Divinity at Oxford University
Richard Watson, Bishop of Burnley
David Wilbourne, former assistant bishop of Llandaff
Trevor Willmott, former bishop of Dover
Kenneth Woollcombe, former Bishop of Oxford
Barry Till, academic and educator
Cherry Vann, current Bishop of Monmouth
Benjamin Vaughan, Bishop of Swansea and Brecon

Gallery

References

External links
Official website
History of the college at Westcott House

 
Educational institutions established in 1887
Anglican seminaries and theological colleges
Anglo-Catholic educational establishments
Institutions of the Cambridge Theological Federation
Anglican buildings and structures in Europe
1887 establishments in England